Auratonota mimstigmosa is a species of moth of the family Tortricidae. It is found in the Western Cordillera in Colombia.

The wingspan is about 25 mm. The ground colour of the forewings is pale brownish gold, the markings more brown especially near the edges. The hindwings are brownish.

Etymology
The species name refers to the similarity to Auratonota spinivalva and is derived from Greek mim- from mimeomai (meaning "I am imitating").

References

Moths described in 2011
Auratonota
Moths of South America